Ramat HaTishbi is a relatively small neighbourhood in Haifa, Israel, located on the western slopes of Mount Carmel, adjacent to the French Carmel neighbourhood. It includes the streets of Hatishbi, Beit El, Shounamit, and Ovadia.

Neighborhoods of Haifa
Mount Carmel